This list of primary and secondary schools in Metro Manila is sorted by city and municipality. It includes both public and private primary and secondary schools that are currently in operation.

Caloocan

Las Piñas

Makati

Malabon

Mandaluyong

City of Manila

Marikina

Muntinlupa

Navotas

Parañaque

Pasay

Pasig

Pateros

Quezon City

San Juan

Taguig

Valenzuela

See also
List of international schools in Metro Manila
List of universities and colleges in Metro Manila